Manay Po!  (aka Oring, Orang, Oroses) is a 2006 Filipino gay-themed comedy film directed by Joel C. Lamangan and starring Cherry Pie Picache, Polo Ravales, John Prats and Jiro Manio.  The film grossed "a phenomenal"  on its opening day.   It was followed in 2008 by the sequel Manay Po 2: Overload. This movie is based on Mano Po, also produced by Regal Films.

Plot
A mother has three boys, but the oldest is a bisexual, the other is openly gay and the youngest is confused about his gender identity. The eldest is an engineer, the other one is an Arts student and the youngest is a high school student.
All is fine until a problem appears. The mother and her boyfriend was robbed and the jewelry set cannot be returned incomplete and she was short of cash. The middle son, rejected by his crush, decides to give his expenses for a gown to add to the balance. The eldest, initially angry, tried to solicit his partner/couple to reduce their savings to help his mother. The eldest son is officially a couple, the middle wins the beauty pageant and the youngest, content with his identity.

Cast

 Cherry Pie Picache as Luzviminda Catacutan
 John Prats as Orson Castello
 Polo Ravales as Oscar Dimagiba
 Jiro Manio as Orwell Castello
 Luis Alandy as Adrian Pengson
 Mike Tan as Marky
 Glaiza de Castro as Pauleen
 IC Mendoza as Frida
 Theo Bernados as Robin
 LJ Reyes as Gina
 Christian Vasquez as Gerry
 Giselle Sanchez as Maritess
 Charles Christianson as Cher
 Jim Pebanco as Rouel
 Justin De Leon as Rowin
 Encar Benedicto as Annabelle
 Allan Paule as Jonathan

Recognition

Awards and nominations
 2007, nominated for a [Philippines Golden Screen Award as 'Best Motion Picture - Musical or Comedy' for Regal Films
 2007, nominated for a Philippines Golden Screen Award as 'Best Performance by an Actress in a Leading Role (Musical or Comedy)' for Cherry Pie Picache

References

External links
 Manay Po! at the Internet Movie Database
  as archived December 26, 2009

Philippine sex comedy films
2000s sex comedy films
2006 LGBT-related films
2006 films
2006 comedy films
Films directed by Joel Lamangan